The Praga BH-111 was a sportsplane of Czechoslovakia, designed and built specifically to compete in Challenge 1932, the European touring plane championships. It was a two-seater low-wing  monoplane.

Design and development

The plane was designed by Pavel Beneš and Miroslav Hajn, hence BH letters. Only three aircraft were built, they carried registrations OK-BAH, OK-BEH and OK-BIH.

Operational history
All three aircraft took part in the Challenge 1932. They took average places, the 16th (Josef Kalla) and 21st (František Klepš) for 43 aircraft. The third pilot Karel Mareš has not finished. In a technical evaluation, BH-111s scored the 4th result from 17 aircraft types taking part in the Challenge.

After the Challenge, they were used as touring aircraft in aero clubs. In 1935 they took part in a rally in Italy, taking the 5th and 27th place for 77 crews.

Description
Mixed construction low-wing monoplane, wing braced with short struts and wire. Fuselage of a steel frame, covered with canvas. Rectangular wings with rounded ends, of wooden construction, canvas covered, fitted with automatic slats and flaps. Wings were folding rearwards. Cab had two seats in tandem, with twin controls, under a common multi-part canopy. Fixed landing gear with a rear skid, main gear with aerodynamic covers. Inline engine in a fuselage nose, two-blade propeller.

Specifications (BH-111)

See also

References

Further reading

 

1930s Czechoslovakian sport aircraft
BH-111
Low-wing aircraft
Single-engined tractor aircraft
Aircraft first flown in 1932